Energa Sopot Match Race is an annual match racing sailing competition and event on the World Match Racing Tour. It is sailed in Diamant 3000 yachts.

Winners

References

Sailing competitions in Poland
World Match Racing Tour
Match racing competitions
Recurring sporting events established in 2004